The following is a list of annual leaders in shutouts in Major League Baseball (MLB). A shutout occurs when a single pitcher throws a complete game and does not allow the opposing team to score a single run.

Walter Johnson holds the career shutout record with 110. The most shutouts pitched in one season was 16, which was a feat accomplished by both Pete Alexander (1916) and George Bradley (1876). In the dead-ball era and throughout much of the first three-quarters of the twentieth century, starting pitchers were generally expected to perform complete games, and starting pitchers would throw dozens of complete games a year — thereby increasing a pitcher's chances of achieving a shutout. These shutout records are among the most secure records in baseball, as pitchers today rarely earn more than one or two shutouts per season with the heavy emphasis on pitch counts and relief pitching. Pitchers today will often pitch only a few, if any, complete games a season. The 2018 season marked a new low for complete-game shutouts; no pitcher threw for more than one shutout during the season, with eleven American League and seven National League pitchers finishing with only one shutout that season.

American League

* – Denotes a member of the Baseball Hall of Fame.
‡ – Denotes a pitcher that led the league in shutouts in their rookie year.

National League

 

* – Denotes a member of the Baseball Hall of Fame.
‡ – Denotes a pitcher that led the league in shutouts in their rookie year.

American Association

Federal League

Players' League

Union Association

National Association

* – Denotes a member of the Baseball Hall of Fame.
‡ – Denotes a pitcher that led the league in shutouts in their rookie year.

References
 Baseball-Reference.com

Shutout champions
Shutout